"A Better Place to Be" is a song by Harry Chapin from his 1972 album, Sniper and Other Love Songs. The song is about a midnight watchman confiding in a waitress, while drinking gin, about a woman that he met a week before and had a one-night stand with.

Released as a single, the song reached No. 18 on the Billboard Bubbling Under chart. A live version, from the 1976 album Greatest Stories Live, reached No. 86 on the Hot 100 chart.

According to Chapin, it was his favorite song that he wrote.

Story
The song begins with "a little man" sitting at a bar, looking glum. The waitress, who is described as a "big ol' friendly girl", notices this in him and asks him what his problem is. The little man ignores the waitress at first, but after "a couple of sips" of gin, he begins to tell her his story.

The song then takes the little man's point of view as he states that he is a midnight watchman at a place called Miller's Tool & Die. One week earlier, he goes to a diner and sees a beautiful girl. Though worried that she's too good for him, the little man still attempts to "give her one good try." Stammering, he makes a fool of himself, but the girl takes his offer, saying in the song's refrain:
 If you want me to come with you
 then that's all right with me
 Because I've been goin' nowhere
 And anywhere's a better place to beThe little man takes her home and attempts to turn on the lights as he enters his room, but the girl tells him to leave the lights off because she "doesn't mind the dark".  The little man cannot believe his good luck, and tries again to speak to the girl, who says only:
 If you want to come here with me then that's all right with me because I've been oh so lonely Loving someone is a better way to be.''

The next day, the little man watches her sleep and leaves early so he can return and surprise her with breakfast. When he returns, he finds she has gone, leaving behind a "six word letter, saying 'It's time that I moved on.'"

After the little man's story, the tearful waitress tells him she wishes that she too were beautiful so she could go home with the little man. He responds to the waitress a "crooked grin", finishes his drink, and acknowledges their shared loneliness by repeating the song's first refrain. He says if she wants him to go home with her "that's alright with [him]" implying he will go home with her.

Although Harry often wrote songs about his own life experiences, it is not known if the "early morning bar room" or factory in Watertown actually existed or does today.

Chart performance

Weekly charts

Live Version

The song was released as a single on the live album, Greatest Stories Live. While introducing the song, Chapin states he came up with the song while visiting Watertown, New York, claiming he "spent a week there one afternoon". The live version was, until 2015 (when David Bowie's Blackstar took the title), the longest song to chart on the Billboard Hot 100.

Chart performance

Weekly charts

Year-end Charts

External links
 A Better Place to Be Lyrics

References

1972 songs
Harry Chapin songs
Songs written by Harry Chapin